Murt Connolly is an Irish former hurler who played as a midfielder for the Castlegar senior team.

Born in Castlegar, County Galway, Connolly first played competitive hurling whilst at school in St Mary's College, Galway. At club level he is a one-time All-Ireland medallist with Castlegar. In addition to this he also won two Connacht medals and two championship medals.

As the youngest of the Connolly dynasty, many of his brothers, John, Pádraic, Joe, Michael, Tom and Gerry, played with distinction for Castlegar and Galway.

In retirement from playing, Connolly became involved in team management and coaching, including as manager of the Mayo senior team.

Honours
Castlegar
All-Ireland Senior Club Hurling Championship (1): 1980
Connacht Senior Club Hurling Championship (2): 1979, 1984
Galway Senior Club Hurling Championship (2): 1979, 1984

References

Year of birth missing (living people)
Living people
Castlegar hurlers
Hurling managers